Rauðilækur (or Syðri-Rauðalækur ) is a small village, more a hamlet, just beside the small town of Hella in southern Iceland.  Established in 1902, the village is named after the stream of the same name that flows on the east side of the hamlet. In 2011 it had a population of 43.

Geography and climate
Temperatures very rarely drop below  during the winter. This is because the Icelandic coastal weather in winter is moderated by the warm waters of the Gulf Stream. The climate is subpolar oceanic (Koppen: Cfc). Its coastal location, it is about  far from the North Atlantic Ocean, does make it prone to wind, and gales are common in winter.

References

Populated places in Southern Region (Iceland)